The Union School, also known a Central Elementary School, was an educational building located in St. Johns, Michigan. It was designated a Michigan State Historic Site and listed on the National Register of Historic Places in 1980. The school building has been replaced by a housing development.

History
The St Johns school district was founded in 1857; the district re-organized in 1862 and built their second permanent building on this site in 1864. The school burned in early 1885, and construction began on the Union School, the third building constructed for the St. Johns school district, later in the year. It was designed by architect Oliver Hidden of the Bay City/Detroit firm Watkins, Hidden, and Arnold. The building was used as a school by the district until 1986.

The district sold the building to private owners, and houses were constructed on the former site of the school in 2000.

Description
The St. Johns Union School was a 2-1/2 story red brick building set on a raised stone foundation and topped with a slate roof. It had a central mass with a hip roof and two T-shaped wings, also with hip roofs. Broad gable roof dormers broke up the roofline on the front facade, and a square belfry tops the center mass. The exterior decoration included Tudor Revival elements on the entrance surrounds, and first- and second-floor window hoods.

On the interior, classrooms were located in the main masses, with the narrow connecting "T" legs containing stairways, a library, and administration offices. When it was constructed, the building had state-of-the-art lighting, heating, ventilation, and fireproofing.

References

Further reading

School buildings on the National Register of Historic Places in Michigan
Queen Anne architecture in Michigan
Tudor Revival architecture in Michigan
School buildings completed in 1885
Defunct schools in Michigan
Michigan State Historic Sites
National Register of Historic Places in Clinton County, Michigan